Madiha El Mehelmy Kotb (born 1953) is an Egyptian-born Canadian mechanical and consulting engineer and former executive at the Régie du Bâtiment du Québec (RBQ), who served as 132nd president of the American Society of Mechanical Engineers in 2013–2014.

In 1980 Kotb joined the workforce. In the 1990s she joined the Régie du bâtiment, the engineering safety watchdog of the Government of Quebec, where she eventually headed of the Pressure vessel Technical Services Division.

From 1989 to 2015 Kotb also served on the Canadian National Board of Boilers and Pressure Vessels Inspectors, and in the year 2013-2014 she served as 132nd president of the American Society of Mechanical Engineers.

Selected publications  
 Kotb, Madiha Mahmoud, Bounce response of Canadian MAGLEV vehicle under periodic and stochastic excitations from the guideways. Masters thesis, Concordia University, 1980.

 Articles, a selection 
 Kotb, Madiha El Mehelmy. "An Ability to Adapt and Change." Mechanical Engineering, 136.11 (2014): 36–37.

References

External links 
 Engineering grad goes global, Concordia University, 2013

1953 births
Living people
Egyptian mechanical engineers
Canadian mechanical engineers
The American University in Cairo alumni
People from Giza
Presidents of the American Society of Mechanical Engineers
20th-century Egyptian engineers
21st-century Canadian women scientists
21st-century Canadian engineers
20th-century Egyptian women